Melissa Ivette Pérez Carballo (born 3 August 1987), better known under her married name Melissa Mikec, is a Salvadoran sports shooter. She competed in the women's 10 meter air rifle and women's 50 meter three positions events at the 2012 Summer Olympics. She is married to fellow Olympics sports shooter Damir Mikec.

Mikec was won two silver medals at the Central American and Caribbean games in Veracruz 2014 and Barranquilla 2018.

References

External links
 

1987 births
Living people
Salvadoran female sport shooters
Olympic shooters of El Salvador
Shooters at the 2012 Summer Olympics
Pan American Games competitors for El Salvador
Shooters at the 2011 Pan American Games
Sportspeople from San Salvador
21st-century Salvadoran women